Seize the Day Inc. is a conservative motivational business seminar company located in  Winchester, Nevada.  Motivational speakers have included Laura Bush, Bill O'Reilly, Terry Bradshaw, Ben Stein, Phil Town, and others.  The seminars are held in major arenas in larger U.S. cities, and the events are titled "Seize the Day + city name" (e.g. "Seize the Day Columbus").

External links
 Seize the Day Business Conference Official Site
 Phil Town Official Site

References

Companies based in Winchester, Nevada
Employee-owned companies of the United States
Human Potential Movement
Personal development